Richard Wilton (died 21 December 1239) was an English scholastic philosopher.

Works

His works included:

a commentary on the Sentences of Peter Lombard;
a treatise in five books against the heresies of his own age;
commentaries on the Book of Genesis and the prophecies of Jeremiah;
three books of quodlibets;
a treatise on the immortality of the soul;
four books on Divine grace.

Life

Little is known for certain, except that he was an Englishman, who joined the Trinitarians.

Claims of Oldoinus in his Athenaeum Romanum,  published at Perugia in 1676, have later been controverted:

The claim that he was nominated Archbishop of Armagh by Pope Innocent III; he certainly never became archbishop. 
He is said to have been created cardinal by Pope Gregory IX with the title of St. Stephen on the Caelian Hill; his name is not found in the lists of cardinals compiled by de Mas Latrie, or the researches of Conrad Eubel.
That he was a doctor of Oxford, Cambridge, and Paris is intrinsically impossible, at least so far as Cambridge is concerned.

References

Attribution
 The entry cites:
A. Oldoinius, Athenaeum Romanum (Perugia, 1676); 
Jacques Lelong, Bibliotheca Sacra (Paris, 1723), giving the date of his death as 1439; 
Johann Albert Fabricius, Bib. Med. AEt., VI (Hamburg, 1746), giving date of his date as 1339, by an obvious misprint; 
Hugo von Hurter, Nomenclator Literarius (Innsbruck, 1899).

1239 deaths
13th-century English Roman Catholic theologians
Scholastic philosophers
Year of birth unknown